"Can You Feel It" is a 1986 song by Mr. Fingers and one of the first deep house records. Its seminal impact on deep house has been compared to that of Derrick May's "Strings of Life" on Detroit techno.

Production
Larry Heard created "Can You Feel It" by using the Roland Juno-60 synthesizer and the Roland TR-909 drum machine. In a 2017 interview with Vice, he recalled, "I had two cassette decks—there were no digital recorders or even multi-track recorders—and I did one take, one pass, on one tape, then ran it back to the other one, played some other parts by hand that I wanted to add, and that was pretty much the recording process."

Release
"Can You Feel It" was originally released as an instrumental on Mr. Fingers' 1986 EP Washing Machine. The song later appeared on Fingers Inc.'s 1988 album Another Side.

There are two mash-up versions of the song: one using Chuck Roberts' speech from the a cappella version of Rhythm Control's "My House", and another using Martin Luther King Jr.'s "I Have a Dream" speech.

Impact and legacy
DJ Pierre picked "Can You Feel It" as one of his "classic cuts" in 1995, saying, "When you hear this it feels like you're on cloud nine. The track uses an organ which is played like strings – long chords which are held and not stabbed. Everyone who hears that song just mellows out and goes back to a time when things were perfect in their lives." Joey Beltram also chose it as one of his favourites the same year, adding, "I also heard this when I was about 14, maybe it was the following week. Mr Fingers was on the radio being played by the same DJ. It was a whole other vibe." 

Darren Emerson included "Can You Feel It" in his top 10 in 1997, adding, "I could have picked a different Mr Fingers track, I love everything he's done - with Robert Owens or by himself - he's one of my favourite artists. 'Can U Feel It' is on the Another Side album, which is one of my favourite LPs. I picked this track because people will understand. I could have gone more anal and trainspotter but this one is a classic. It's hard to make a good record that's minimal, you can add things but it doesn't necessarily make it better. The chords and funky little drum and Fingers bassline are great. He's my hero."

In 2014, Rolling Stone included the song on the 20 Best Chicago House Records list.

In 2015, Pitchfork placed it at number 76 on the 200 Best Songs of the 1980s list. Patric Fallon wrote: "Vocalless in its original form, the 1986 single has no hook and eschews all semblance of pop structure, completely surrendering to an endless groove built on jazzy hi-hats and sumptuous chords."

In 2017, Mixmag included it on the Best 20 House Classics from Before 1990 list.

In 2018, Time Out placed the song at number five on the 20 Best House Tracks Ever list.

In 2020, NME included it on the 20 Best House Music Songs list. El Hunt stated that the song is "commonly regarded as one of the first examples of deep house thanks to its meditative, ambient undercurrent." Same year, Slant Magazine placed it at number 68 on the 100 Best Dance Songs of All Time list.

In 2022, Rolling Stone ranked "Can You Feel It" number 70 in their list of 200 Greatest Dance Songs of All Time.

Track listing
 7", UK (1988)
"Can You Feel It"
"My House" (Acappella)

 12", UK (1988)
"Can You Feel It" (Vocal) – 5:53
"Can You Feel It" (Instrumental) – 5:55
"Can You Feel It" (Spoken Word: Dr. Martin Luther King Jr.) – 5:54
"Can You Feel It" (Accapella) – 5:10

Charts

References

External links
 

1986 singles
1986 songs
Deep house songs
Mr. Fingers songs
Song recordings produced by Larry Heard